B.C.'s Quest for Tires is an horizontally scrolling video game designed by Rick Banks and Michael Bate and published by Sierra On-Line in 1983. Versions were released for the Commodore 64, Atari 8-bit family, ColecoVision, ZX Spectrum, MSX, and Apple II. Based on the comic strip B.C. by Johnny Hart, BC's Quest for Tires is similar to Irem's Moon Patrol from the previous year. The title is a play on the title of the contemporaneous film Quest for Fire. A sequel, Grog's Revenge, was released in 1984.

In retrospect, the title has been referred to as the first endless runner game.

Plot
The player takes the role of the caveman Thor, who has to rescue his girlfriend, "Cute Chick", who has been kidnapped by a dinosaur. To do this, he must travel on his stone unicycle (actually an impossible wheel) through several levels. Each level has Thor moving from the left to the right, avoiding various dangers.

Gameplay

B.C.'s Quest for Tires is an action game taking place on several consecutive levels.  The levels start out simple, with Thor having to jump over potholes or duck under tree branches. Later levels become more complex, for example requiring Thor to jump on turtles in order to cross a lake, or to be carried over a lava pit by a "Dooky Bird". Other B.C. characters, such as the Fat Broad, also appear on some levels.

Reception
Softline stated that, given the conventional gameplay ("it's that get-from-point-A-to-point-B kind of game"), the use of the familiar comic characters made "the player feel like finishing the game is worthwhile ... [Otherwise] it's just not the same". The magazine concluded that "B.C.'s Quest for Tires isn't so much a computer game as it is an interactive cartoon. This cartoon has its limits, but it does provide some challenge". Antic approved of the game not being another "'shoot the aliens and save the world' scenario", and the "first rate" animation, but predicted that most players would "enjoy the game for a day or two, then relegate it to the shelf". Compute! praised the game's "excellent graphics" and animation, which "approach cartoon standards".

David Stone reviewed the game for Computer Gaming World, and stated that "QFT requires far more timing than strategy and, rather than levels of play, it offers new obstacles to overcome on the way to the rescue. Still, it is fun to play."

Awards
 Critic's Choice Awards: Best Game For Youngsters (awarded by Family Computing).
 Arkie Award: Most Humorous Video/Computer Game (awarded by Electronic Games).
 Colecovision Game of the Year (awarded by Video Game Update).
 Best use of Graphics and Sound in a Video Game (awarded by Billboard (magazine)).
 1984 Golden Floppy Award for Excellence: Funniest Game of the Year, Video Games Category (Computer Games magazine).

References

External links
 BC's Quest for Tires at Atari Mania
 
 

1983 video games
Sierra Entertainment games
Apple II games
Atari 8-bit family games
ColecoVision games
Commodore 64 games
MSX games
ZX Spectrum games
Video games based on comics
Prehistoric people in popular culture
Video games developed in Canada
Video games set in prehistory
Single-player video games
Sydney Development Corporation games